Littleton Waller Tazewell Waller, Jr. (September 18, 1886 – April 14, 1967) was a highly decorated officer of the United States Marine Corps who attained the rank of major general while serving as Marine Corps Director of Personnel during World War II.

He was the son of famous Marine Corps Major General Littleton "Tony" Waller.

Early years

Waller was born on September 18, 1886, in Norfolk, Virginia. He was the son of Marine Corps Major General Littleton "Tony" Waller and his wife Clara Wynn Waller (1862–1958), the oldest of three children, his two brothers were Rear Admiral John B. W. Waller and Marine Corps Brigadier General Henry T. Waller. His cousin, James D. Waller was also marine officer, who served during World War II and retired as brigadier general.

Littleton Jr. was commissioned a second lieutenant in the Marine Corps in October 1907 and first served with the Marine detachment in the Panama Canal Zone.

He was subsequently sent to Beijing, China, where he served as a member of the American Legation Guard.

After his return to the United States, he was assigned to the Marine barracks in Norfolk, Virginia, and promoted to the rank of first lieutenant in 1911. At the barracks, he mostly worked on target practice instruction.

In 1914 he was sent to Veracruz, Mexico, as a member of the First Marine Brigade. During this time, he was under the command of his father. Following his service in Mexico, Waller Jr. was transferred to the battleship USS "Michigan'', where he was appointed commander of the Marine detachment in 1915. One year later, he was promoted to the rank of captain.

World War I

The United States entered World War I in April 1917. Waller Jr. received a temporary promotion to the rank of major and was assigned to the 1st Machine Gun Battalion as a company commander. Waller sailed to France in December 1917 as a member of the Machine Gun Battalion of the 4th Marine Brigade, 2nd Division.

After a short period of service with the 3rd Division, he was appointed 2nd Division Machine Gun Officer. In this capacity, Waller distinguished himself during the Battle of Belleau Wood and Battle of Soissons, when the units under his command helped support successful infantry attacks.

For his leadership during these battles, Waller was decorated with the Navy Cross. He remained in command of the 6th Machine Gun Battalion and was decorated with the Silver Star for heroism in action during the Meuse-Argonne Offensive. However, he was seriously wounded and was succeeded by Major Matthew H. Kingman. After recovering, Waller was assigned to the general staff of the 2nd Division, where he served as Division Machine Gun Officer for the rest of the war. He subsequently participated in occupation duties in Germany until 1919.

The Government of France additionally decorated Waller with the Légion d'honneur, French Croix de guerre 1914–1918 with Palm and the Fourragère.

Later career and World War II

As a skilled marksman, Waller was active in the Olympic rifle and pistol teams. He retired from the Marine Corps in 1921 to take care of his disabled father, however, he remained in the Marine Corps Reserve and was promoted to lieutenant colonel in November 1934. He served as president of the National Rifle Association 1939–1940.

Waller was recalled to active duty in June 1941 as officer in charge of target practice at Marine Corps Headquarters, Washington, D.C. He was promoted to the rank of colonel in January 1942. Almost one year later, Waller was promoted to the rank of brigadier general and appointed as director of Marine Corps personnel.

He remained in this capacity until September 1944, when he was transferred to the Pacific Theater, where he was appointed commanding general of the Marine defense on Johnston and Midway Atolls. He was also responsible for defending the naval bases in the Hawaiian Islands, where he was commander of the Marine garrison force of the 14th Naval District. He was awarded the Legion of Merit for his service.

Waller retired from the Marine Corps in 1946 and was advanced to the rank of major general on the retired list due to having been specially commended in combat.

Following his retirement, Waller was the owner of two Philadelphia automobile agencies.

He died on April 14, 1967, at Abington Memorial Hospital in Willow Grove, Pennsylvania.

He is buried at All Saints Episcopal Church Cemetery in Torresdale, Philadelphia.

Decorations

 

General Waller also received the Distinguished Marksmanship Badge.

References

1886 births
1967 deaths
Military personnel from Norfolk, Virginia
United States Marine Corps personnel of World War I
United States Marine Corps World War II generals
United States Marines
United States Marine Corps generals
Recipients of the Navy Cross (United States)
Recipients of the Silver Star
Recipients of the Legion of Merit
Chevaliers of the Légion d'honneur
Recipients of the Croix de Guerre 1914–1918 (France)
Presidents of the National Rifle Association